Amblyseius aequipilus is a species of mite in the family Phytoseiidae.

References

aequipilus
Articles created by Qbugbot
Animals described in 1914